Alistair Henry Mauchlen (born 29 June 1960) is a Scottish former footballer who later went into coaching.

Playing career

Early years in Scotland
Born in Kilwinning, after beginning his career with junior club Irvine Meadow, Mauchlen entered league football in August 1978 when he signed for Kilmarnock of the Scottish Football League First Division. The following season Mauchlen was a regular in a Kilmarnock side that stayed up despite being part-time and was one of the stars of a 2–0 win over Celtic in November 1979.

In October 1982 Mauchlen transferred to Motherwell where he soon gained a strong following amongst the supporters for his organisational skill and his aggression. He was appointed club captain in 1984 and helped his side to the First Division title that season. Motherwell were however suffering from financial difficulties at that time and, with Mauchlen one of their most saleable assets, it was only a matter of time before he left.

In England
Mauchlen moved to Leicester City in August 1985 as part of deal that also saw teammate Gary McAllister make the switch to Filbert Street. The deal amounted to a combined fee of £350,000. Mauchlen turned out in 239 Football League matches for the club. Mauchlen joined Leeds United on loan on 12 March 1992 but left the club at the end of that month without making a first team appearance.

Later career
Mauchlen returned to Scotland with Heart of Midlothian in 1992, making 18 league appearances. Unable to command a regular first team place, Mauchlen was loaned to Irish Football League side Glenavon in November 1993, making the move permanent the following season. He switched to Ballymena United in August 1995.

Mauchlen returned to England with non-league club Leicester United in summer 1996. In August Mauchlen scored the winning goal in their 3–2 Southern Football League Midland Division win over Grantham. The following day however it was announced in a shock move that Leicester United had been liquidated. A free agent, Mauchlen promptly signed for Corby Town. He subsequently turned out for VS Rugby and Hinckley Town.

Coaching career
During the late 1990s Mauchlen managed Oadby Town. In 1997, whilst in charge at Oadby, he was offered the chance to return to Glenavon as manager but he rejected the opportunity after feeling that the contract he was offered was not satisfactory. He returned to Oadby Town around 2004 as a coach under manager Lee Adam.

As of 2011 Mauchlen is living back in Leicester where he works for British Gas. His son Iain was for a time on the books at Cowdenbeath.

References

1960 births
Living people
People from Kilwinning
Scottish footballers
Footballers from North Ayrshire
Association football midfielders
Scottish Football League players
English Football League players
NIFL Premiership players
Kilmarnock F.C. players
Motherwell F.C. players
Leicester City F.C. players
Leeds United F.C. players
Heart of Midlothian F.C. players
Glenavon F.C. players
Ballymena United F.C. players
Leicester United F.C. players
Corby Town F.C. players
Rugby Town F.C. players
Hinckley United F.C. players
Scottish football managers
Irvine Meadow XI F.C. players